Schreiber's fringe-fingered lizard (Acanthodactylus schreiberi) is a species of lizard in the family Lacertidae. The species is endemic to the Middle East.

Etymology
Both the specific name, schreiberi, and the common name, Schreiber's fringe-fingered lizard, are in honor of Austrian zoologist Egid Schreiber (1836-1913), author of Herpetologia Europaea (1875).

Geographic range
A. schreiberi is found in Cyprus, Israel, Lebanon, and Turkey.

Habitat
The natural habitats of Schreiber's fringe-fingered lizard are sandy shores, pastureland, and plantations.

Reproduction
A. schreiberi is oviparous.

Conservation status
A. schreiberi is threatened by habitat loss.

References

Further reading
Boulenger GA (1878). "Sur les espèces d'Acanthodatyles des bords de la Méditerranée ". Bull. Soc. zool. France 3: 179–197. ("Acanthodactylus Savignyi Var. Schreiberii ", new variety, pp. 188–191). (in French).
Boulenger GA (1887). "List of Reptiles and Batrachians from Cyprus". Ann. Mag. Nat. Hist., Fifth Series 20: 344–345. ("Acanthodactylus Schreiberi ", new status, p. 344).
Salvador, Alfredo (1982). "A revision of the lizards of the genus Acanthodactylus (Sauria: Lacertidae)". Bonner Zoologische Monographien (16): 1–167. (Acanthodactylus schreiberi, pp. 38–42, Figures 7–9, Map 16). (in English, with an abstract in German).
Tamar, Karin; Carranza, Salvador; Sindaco, Roberto; Moravec, Jiří; Meiri, Shai (2014). "Systematics and phylogeography of Acanthodactylus schreiberi and its relationships with Acanthodactylus boskianus (Reptilia: Squamata: Lacertidae)". Zoological Journal of the Linnean Society 172 (3): 720–739.

Acanthodactylus
Fauna of Cyprus
Reptiles of the Middle East
Fauna of Lebanon
Reptiles of Turkey
Reptiles described in 1878
Taxa named by George Albert Boulenger
Taxonomy articles created by Polbot